Coronella austriaca fitzingeri is a subspecies of the snake Coronella austriaca (commonly known as the smooth snake). It lives in southern Italy and Sicily.

References

 Steward JW. 1971. The Snakes of Europe. Cranbury, New Jersey: Associated University Press (Fairleigh Dickinson University Press). 238 pp. LCCCN 77-163307. .

Reptiles of Europe
Reptiles of Sicily